Leighton-Linslade was an urban district in Bedfordshire, England from 1965 to 1974.

Formation
Leighton-Linslade Urban District was created on 1 April 1965 as a merger of Leighton Buzzard Urban District in Bedfordshire and Linslade Urban District in Buckinghamshire. The new urban district was placed entirely in Bedfordshire, thereby transferring Linslade from Buckinghamshire to Bedfordshire. The urban areas of the two original towns of Leighton Buzzard and Linslade had become contiguous through industrial expansion and housing development. From the creation of Leighton-Linslade Urban District in 1965 they were treated for administrative purposes as a single town called Leighton-Linslade.

The new council was granted a coat of arms in January 1966, less than a year after the council's creation.

Premises

The new council inherited offices at 6 Leighton Road in Linslade from Linslade Urban District Council and at the White House, 37 Hockliffe Street in Leighton Buzzard from Leighton Buzzard Urban District Council. The White House was used as the new council's main offices throughout its existence.

Abolition
Leighton-Linslade urban district was abolished by the Local Government Act 1972, with its area becoming part of the non-metropolitan district of South Bedfordshire on 1 April 1974. A successor parish was created called Leighton-Linslade Town Council.

References

History of Bedfordshire
Local government in Bedfordshire
Districts of England abolished by the Local Government Act 1972
Urban districts of England